The following outline is provided as an overview of and topical guide to Milan:

Milan – capital of Lombardy and the second most populous city in Italy after Rome. Milan is considered a leading Alpha Global City, with strengths in the arts, commerce, design, education, entertainment, fashion, finance, healthcare, media, services, research, and tourism. The city has long been named a fashion capital of the world and a world's design capital, thanks to several international events and fairs, including Milan Fashion Week and the Milan Furniture Fair, which are currently among the world's biggest in terms of revenue, visitors and growth. Milan is the destination of 8 million overseas visitors every year, attracted by its museums and art galleries that boast some of the most important collections in the world, including major works by Leonardo da Vinci.

General reference 
 Pronunciation:  ,  ;  ;  
 Common English name(s): Milan
 Official English name(s): City of Milan
 Adjectival(s): Milanese
 Demonym(s): Milanese

Geography of Milan 

Geography of Milan
 Milan is:
 a city
 the capital of Lombardy
 Population of Milan: 1,357,599
 Area of Milan:  
 Atlas of Milan

Location of Milan 

 Milan is situated within the following regions:
 Northern Hemisphere and Eastern Hemisphere
 Eurasia
 Europe (outline)
 Western Europe
 Southern Europe
 Italian Peninsula
 Italy (outline)
 Northern Italy
 Lombardy
 Milan metropolitan area (aka Greater Milan)
 Metropolitan City of Milan
 Time zone(s): Central European Time (UTC+01), Central European Summer Time (UTC+02)

Environment of Milan 

 Climate of Milan

Landforms of Milan

Areas of Milan

Zones of Milan 

Zones of Milan
 Zone 1 of Milan
 Zone 2 of Milan
 Zone 3 of Milan
 Zone 4 of Milan
 Zone 5 of Milan
 Zone 6 of Milan
 Zone 7 of Milan
 Zone 8 of Milan
 Zone 9 of Milan

Districts of Milan 

The districts of Milan, by zone:

 Districts of Zone 1
 Brera
 Conca del Naviglio
 Guastalla
 Porta Sempione
 Porta Tenaglia

 Districts of Zone 2
 Adriano
 Crescenzago
 Gorla
 Greco
 Loreto
 Maggiolina
 Mandello
 Mirabello
 Ponte Seveso
 Porta Nuova
 Precotto
 Stazione Centrale
 Turro
 Villaggio dei Giornalisti

 Districts of Zone 3
 Casoretto
 Cimiano
 Città Studi
 Dosso
 Lambrate
 Ortica
 Porta Monforte
 Porta Venezia
 Quartiere Feltre
 Rottole

 Districts of Zone 4
 Acquabella
 Calvairate
 Castagnedo
 Cavriano
 Forlanini
 Gamboloita
 La Trecca
 Monluè
 Morsenchio
 Nosedo
 Omero
 Ponte Lambro
 Porta Vittoria
 Porta Romana
 Rogoredo
 San Luigi
 Santa Giulia
 Taliedo
 Triulzo Superiore

 Districts of Zone 5
 Basmetto
 Cantalupa
 Case Nuove
 Chiaravalle
 Chiesa Rossa
 Conca Fallata
 Fatima
 Gratosoglio
 Le Terrazze
 Macconago
 Missaglia
 Morivione
 Porta Lodovica
 Porta Vigentina
 Quintosole
 Ronchetto delle Rane
 San Gottardo
 Selvanesco
 Stadera
 Torretta
 Vaiano Valle
 Vigentino

 Districts of Zone 6
 Arzaga 
 Barona 
 Boffalora 
 Cascina Bianca 
 Conchetta 
 Creta 
 Foppette 
 Giambellino-Lorenteggio 
 Lodovico il Moro 
 Moncucco 
 Porta Genova 
 Porta Ticinese 
 Ronchetto sul Naviglio 
 San Cristoforo 
 Sant'Ambrogio 
 Teramo 
 Villa Magentino 
 Villaggio dei Fiori

 Districts of Zone 7
 Assiano 
 Baggio 
 Figino 
 Fopponino 
 Forze Armate 
 Harar 
 La Maddalena 
 Muggiano 
 Porta Magenta 
 Quartiere degli Olmi 
 Quarto Cagnino 
 Quinto Romano 
 San Siro 
 Valsesia 
 Vercellese

 Districts of Zone 8
 Boldinasco 
 Bullona 
 Cagnola 
 Campo dei Fiori 
 Cascina Triulza 
 Comina 
 Fiera 
 Gallaratese
 Garegnano 
 Ghisolfa 
 Lampugnano 
 Musocco 
 Porta Volta 
 Portello 
 Quarto Oggiaro 
 QT8 
 Roserio 
 San Leonardo 
 Trenno 
 Varesina 
 Vialba 
 Villapizzone

 Districts of Zone 9
 Affori 
 Bicocca 
 Bovisa 
 Bovisasca 
 Bruzzano 
 Ca' Granda 
 Centro Direzionale 
 Comasina 
 Dergano 
 Fulvio Testi 
 Isola 
 La Fontana 
 Montalbino 
 Niguarda 
 Porta Garibaldi 
 Porta Nuova 
 Prato Centenaro 
 Segnano

Locations in Milan 

 10 Corso Como
 Biblioteca Ambrosiana
 Biblioteca di Brera
 Cimitero Monumentale di Milano
 Milan amphitheatre
 Planetario di Milano
 Walls of Milan

City gates of Milan 

 Porta Nuova
 Porta Romana
 Porta Sempione
 Porta Ticinese
 Porta Garibaldi

Gardens and parks in Milan 

 Basilicas Park
 Giardini Pubblici Indro Montanelli
 Orto Botanico di Brera
 Orto Botanico di Cascina Rosa
 Parco Agricolo Sud Milano
 Parco Sempione
Torre Branca
 Villa Litta Modignani

Museums and galleries in Milan 
Museums and galleries in Milan
 Alfa Romeo Museum
 Armani/Silos
 Bagatti Valsecchi Museum
 Civic Aquarium
 Galleria d'Arte Moderna
 Gallerie di Piazza Scala
 Palazzo Anguissola
 Palazzo Brentani
 Museo Civico di Storia Naturale di Milano
 Museo del Novecento
 Museo del Risorgimento
 Museo della Scienza e della Tecnologia "Leonardo da Vinci"
 Museo Diocesano
 Museo Poldi Pezzoli
 Museo Teatrale alla Scala
 Contemporary Art Pavilion
 Pinacoteca Ambrosiana
 Pinacoteca di Brera
 Sforza Castle
 Antique Furniture & Wooden Sculpture Museum
 Applied Arts Collection
 Archaeological Museum
 Egyptian Museum
 Museum of Musical Instruments
 Museo d'Arte Antica
 Pinacoteca

Public squares in Milan 

Piazzas in Milan
 Piazza Cordusio
 Piazza del Duomo
 Piazza della Scala
 Piazza Mercanti

Religious sites in Milan 

 Cathedrals in Milan
 Basilicas in Milan
 Churches in Milan

Shopping malls in Milan 

 Galleria Vittorio Emanuele II

Streets and canals in Milan 

 Corso Buenos Aires
 Navigli
Naviglio di Bereguardo
Naviglio di Paderno
Naviglio Grande
Naviglio Martesana
Naviglio Pavese
 Quadrilatero della moda
 Via della Spiga
 Via Monte Napoleone

Villas and palaces in Milan 

Villas and palaces in Milan
 Casa Campanini
 Casa degli Omenoni
 Casa di Riposo per Musicisti
 Casa Manzoni
 Casa Panigarola
 Castello Cova
 Palazzo dell'Arengario
 Palazzo della Banca Commerciale Italiana
 Palazzo Belgioioso
 Palazzo Borromeo
 Palazzo Carminati
 Palazzo Castiglioni
 Palazzo dei Giureconsulti
 Palazzo Mezzanotte
 Palazzo della Ragione
 Palazzo delle Scuole Palatine
 Palazzo del Senato
 Royal Palace of Milan
 Villa Belgiojoso Bonaparte

Demographics of Milan 

Demographics of Milan

Government and politics of Milan 

Government and politics of Milan
 Elections in Milan
Milan municipal election, 2016
 Government of Milan
 Mayor of Milan
 List of mayors of Milan
 City Council of Milan
 International relations
 Sister cities of Milan

History of Milan 

History of Milan
 Mediolanum

History of Milan, by period

 Timeline of Milan

History of Milan, by subject 

 Bava-Beccaris massacre
 Edict of Milan
 Five Days of Milan
 Golden Ambrosian Republic
 Great Plague of Milan
 Piazza Fontana bombing
 Rulers of Milan
House of Sforza

Culture in Milan 

Culture of Milan
 Architecture of Milan
Buildings in Milan
Tallest buildings in Milan
Villas and palaces in Milan
Neoclassical architecture in Milan
 Cuisine of Milan
Lombard cuisine
 Fashion in Milan
Fashion capital
Milan fashion district
Milan Fashion Week
 Languages of Milan
Western Lombard dialect
Milanese dialect
 Media in Milan
 Newspapers
Corriere della Sera
 Il Giornale
 Il Giorno
 Radio stations
 RTL 102.5
 Radio 24
 Radio Classica
 Museums in Milan
 People from Milan
 Stolpersteine in Milan
 Symbols of Milan
 Flag of Milan

Art in Milan 

 Novecento Italiano

Ballet in Milan 
 La Scala Theatre Ballet
La Scala Theatre Ballet School

Cinema of Milan 
 Films set in Milan
Miracle in Milan

Literature of Milan 
 Western Lombard literature

Music of Milan 

Music of Milan
 Casa Ricordi
 Milan Conservatory
 Orchestra Sinfonica di Milano Giuseppe Verdi

Theatre of Milan 

 La Scala
 Piccolo Teatro
 Teatro degli Arcimboldi
 Teatro Dal Verme
 Teatro Lirico

Theatre school in Milan
 Accademia dei Filodrammatici

Events and traditions in Milan 

 EICMA
 Expo 2015
 Fiera Milano
 Milan Fashion Week
 Milan Furniture Fair
 Milan International (1906)
 Oh bej! Oh bej!
 Milan Triennial

Religion in Milan 

Religion in Milan
 Ambrose
 Ambrosian Rite
 Early Christian churches in Milan

Catholicism in Milan 

Catholicism in Milan
 Bishop of Milan
 Diocese of Milan
 Roman Catholic Archdiocese of Milan
 Chiaravalle Abbey
 Garegnano Charterhouse
 Mirasole Abbey

Cathedrals in Milan 

 Milan Cathedral
 Basilica di Santa Tecla
 Madonnina (statue)

Basilicas in Milan 

 Basilica of Sant'Ambrogio
 Basilica di San Calimero
 San Carlo al Corso
 Basilica of Sant'Eustorgio
 Portinari Chapel
 Basilica of San Lorenzo
Colonne di San Lorenzo
 San Marco
 Santa Maria delle Grazie
 The Last Supper (Leonardo da Vinci)
 Santa Maria della Passione
 San Nazaro in Brolo
 Basilica of San Simpliciano
 Basilica di Santo Stefano Maggiore
 San Vincenzo in Prato
 San Vittore al Corpo

Churches in Milan 

 San Angelo
 San Antonio Abate
 San Barnaba
 San Bernardino alle Ossa
 San Cristoforo sul Naviglio
 San Fedele
 San Giorgio al Palazzo
 San Giovanni in Conca
 San Gottardo
 Santa Maria del Carmine
 Santa Maria della Pace
 Santa Maria Incoronata
 Santa Maria presso San Celso
 Santa Maria presso San Satiro
 San Maurizio al Monastero Maggiore
 San Pietro in Gessate
 San Sebastiano
 San Sepolcro
 Oratorio di San Protaso
 Rotonda della Besana

Sports in Milan 
 

Sports in Milan
 Basketball in Milan
 Pallacanestro Olimpia Milano
 Football in Milan
 Association football in Milan
A.C. Milan
History of A.C. Milan
List of A.C. Milan players
Inter Milan
History of Inter Milan
List of Inter Milan players
 Milan Derby
 Running in Milan
 Milan Marathon
 Sports venues in Milan 
 Arena Civica
Notturna di Milano
 Mediolanum Forum
 San Siro
 Velodromo Vigorelli

Economy and infrastructure of Milan 

Economy of Milan
 Banking in Milan
 Borsa Italiana
 Business district of Milan
 CityLife
 Porta Nuova
 Hotels in Milan
 Grand Hotel et de Milan
 Principe di Savoia
 Town House Galleria
 Restaurants and cafés in Milan 
Caffè Cova
Cracco Peck
 Tourism in Milan
Touring Club Italiano

Transportation in Milan 

Transport in Milan
Airports in Milan
 Linate Airport
 Milan Malpensa Airport
Malpensa Express

Rail transport in Milan 

 ATM (Azienda Trasporti Milanesi)
 Trenord
 Railway stations in Milan
Milan Central railway station
 Trams in Milan
 Trolleybuses in Milan

Milan Metro 
 Milan Metro

 
 
 
 
 
 List of Milan Metro stations
 AnsaldoBreda Meneghino

Milan suburban railway service 

 Suburban railway

 
 
 
 
 
 
 
 
 
 
 
 
 List of Milan suburban railway stations
 Milan Passante railway
 Treno Servizio Regionale

Bicycle sharing systems in Milan 
 BikeMi
Mobike

Education in Milan 

Education in Milan
 Public education in Milan
 Academies in Milan
 Brera Academy
 Universities in Milan
 Public
 University of Milan
 University of Milan Bicocca
 Polytechnic University of Milan
 Private
 Università Cattolica del Sacro Cuore
 IULM University of Milan
 Bocconi University
Bocconi University School of Law
 Vita-Salute San Raffaele University
 Humanitas University

Healthcare in Milan 

Hospitals in Milan
 Ospedale Niguarda Ca' Granda
 Policlinico of Milan
 San Raffaele Hospital

See also 

 Outline of geography

References

External links 

 City of Milan
 ATM—Milan's Transportation Company
 Rete Metropolitana di Milano 
 Videotour in Milan

Milan
Milan